The Kanianitis is a river in Phocis, central Greece. It receives its water from the mountains Oeta and Giona. It flows through the villages Kastellia, Gravia and Mariolata, and flows into the Cephissus near the village Lilaia in the municipality of Parnassos. In antiquity, it was called Pindos or Pindus. The Pindus was a river of ancient Phocis and Doris. The ancient cities Lilaea and Pindus were situated on the river.

References

Landforms of Phocis
Rivers of Central Greece
Rivers of Greece